Kalin Karaivanov (29 January 1967 – 7 September 2019) was a Bulgarian bridge player.

Bridge accomplishments

Wins
 North American Bridge Championships (1)
 Jacoby Open Swiss Teams (1) 2007

Runners-up
 Buffett Cup (1) 2012

Notes

External links
 

1967 births
2019 deaths
Bulgarian contract bridge players